Leandro Fonseca (born 14 February 1975 in Jaboticabal) is a Brazilian former professional footballer who played as a striker.

References

External links
 

Living people
1975 births
People from Jaboticabal
Association football forwards
Brazilian footballers
Bundesliga players
2. Bundesliga players
Swiss Super League players
Coritiba Foot Ball Club players
FC Carl Zeiss Jena players
FC St. Gallen players
FC Wil players
SSV Ulm 1846 players
FC Lausanne-Sport players
Neuchâtel Xamax FCS players
BSC Young Boys players
Hannover 96 players
Grasshopper Club Zürich players
FC Thun players
Yverdon-Sport FC players
Brazilian expatriate footballers
Brazilian expatriate sportspeople in Germany
Expatriate footballers in Germany
Brazilian expatriate sportspeople in Switzerland
Expatriate footballers in Switzerland
Footballers from São Paulo (state)